The Royal Yacht Club of Tasmania, is the largest yacht club in the Australian state of Tasmania, and is best known for its role as the finishing destination for the annual Sydney to Hobart Yacht Race. The club sports a range of facilities, from a 120-berth marina to on-site maintenance facilities.

Originally known as the Derwent Sailing Boat Club, for its location on the Derwent River in Hobart, the club was founded in 1880. It was called such for thirty years until, in 1910, King Edward VII granted the organisation permission to use the prefix "Royal".

See also
Sport in Tasmania

References
 The Royal Yacht Club Official Website
 SAILING ON... A History of The Royal Yacht Club of Tasmania. Geeves, M.D. et al. (Centenary Book Committee).

External links
 The Royal Yacht Club Official Website

Royal yacht clubs
Yacht clubs in Tasmania
Yacht Club of Tasmania, Royal
1880 establishments in Australia
Sydney to Hobart Yacht Race
Sports clubs established in 1880
Sporting clubs in Tasmania
Sport in Hobart